Northern Districts is a baseball club playing in the South Australian Baseball League. Known as the Reds, their home ground is Walkleys Park in Ingle Farm.

External links

Australian baseball clubs
Sporting clubs in Adelaide